Eyüpoğlu can refer to:

 Eyüpoğlu, Aşkale
 Eyüpoğlu, Bartın